Kocapınar is a village in Silifke district of Mersin Province, Turkey. It is situated on the southern slopes of the Taurus Mountains, to the northwest of Taşucu. The population of the village was 128 as of 2012. The main economic activity is farming.

References

Villages in Silifke District